Amirabad (also Romanized as Amīrābād) is a village in Bidak Rural District, in the Central District of Abadeh County, Fars Province, Iran. At the 2006 census, its population was 363, in 103 families.

References 

Populated places in Abadeh County